The KALI (Kilo Ampere Linear Injector) is a linear electron accelerator being developed in India by Defence Research and Development Organisation (DRDO) and Bhabha Atomic Research Centre (BARC). It is said by many organisations and institutes to have directed-energy weapon capabilities. This KALI weapon is said to be India's top-secret weapon.

Overview 
The KALI is a particle accelerator. It emits powerful pulses of electrons.  Other components in the machine down the line convert the electron energy into electromagnetic radiation, which can be adjusted to x-ray or microwave frequencies.

Its intended use is as a countermeasure against enemy invasion. Such a high-powered microwave gun may be able to disable incoming missiles and aircraft by destroying their electronic circuitry and rendering them out of control.

History

The project was first founded by Dr. P.H. Ron, and mooted in 1985 by the then Director of the BARC, Dr. R. Chidambaram. Work on the project began in 1989, being developed by the Accelerators & Pulse Power Division of the BARC.  DRDO is also involved with this project. It was initially developed for industrial applications, although defence applications became clearer later.

The first accelerators had an electron beam power of ~0.4GW, which increased as later versions were developed. These were the KALI 80, KALI 200, KALI 1000, and the KALI 5000.

The KALI-1000 was commissioned for use in late 2004.

Applications

The KALI has been put to various uses by the DRDO.

The X-rays emitted are being used in Ballistics research as an illuminator for ultrahigh speed photography by the Terminal Ballistics Research Institute (TBRL) in Chandigarh. The Microwave emissions are used for EM Research.
 
The microwave-producing version of KALI has also been used by the DRDO scientists for testing the vulnerability of the electronic systems of the Light Combat Aircraft (LCA), which was then under development.

It has also helped in designing electrostatic shields to "harden" the LCA and missiles from microwave attack by the enemy as well as protecting  satellites against deadly Electromagnetic Impulses (EMI) generated by nuclear weapons and other cosmic disturbances, which "fry" and destroy electronic circuits.  Electronic components currently used in missiles can withstand fields of approximately 300 V/cm, while the fields in case of an EMI attack can reach thousands of V/cm.

See also

 Defence industry of India
 DRDO Smart Anti-Airfield Weapon
 Indian Space Research Organisation
 Guided missiles of India
 India and weapons of mass destruction 
 Indian Ballistic Missile Defence Programme

References

External links
 http://www.barc.gov.in/btdg/appd/power.html

Particle accelerators
Military equipment of India
Defence Research and Development Organisation